Ray Bryant Trio is a 1957 album by jazz pianist Ray Bryant with drummer Specs Wright and bassist Ike Isaacs that was recorded on April 5, 1957, at Van Gelder Studio and released as Prestige 7098.

Reception 

AllMusic reviewer Ron Wynn awarded the album 4 stars, calling it "outstanding" and noting that it displays Bryant's "facility with the blues, speed, gospel influence, and interpretive abilities."

Track listing 
"Golden Earrings" (Ray Evans / Jay Livingston / Victor Young) – 4:53
"Angel Eyes" (Earl Brent / Matt Dennis) – 3:23
"Blues Changes" (Ray Bryant) – 5:03
"Splittin'" (Ray Bryant) – 4:38
"Django" (John Lewis) – 5:05
"The Thrill is Gone" (Lew Brown / Ray Henderson) – 4:56
"Daahoud" (Clifford Brown) – 4:04
"Sonar" (Kenny Clarke / Gerald Wiggins) – 3:23

Personnel 
 Ray Bryant — piano
 Ike Isaacs — double bass
 Specs Wright — drums

References 

1957 albums
Prestige Records albums
Ray Bryant albums
Albums recorded at Van Gelder Studio